Asplenium polyodon, commonly known as sickle spleenwort, is a species of fern in the family Aspleniaceae. The distribution of A. polyodon includes parts of the countries of Australia and New Zealand. A specific locale of occurrence is in forested areas of Westland, New Zealand, where associate understory species include crown fern.

References
 Gwen J. Harden. 1992. Flora of New South Wales, Published by UNSW Press, 775 pages  , 
 C. Michael Hogan. 2009. Crown Fern: Blechnum discolor, Globaltwitcher.com, ed. N. Stromberg

Line notes

polyodon
Ferns of New Zealand
Flora of New South Wales
Flora of Queensland
Flora of Victoria (Australia)